The Individuated Hobbit: Jung, Tolkien, and the Archetypes of Middle-Earth (1979) is a critical study of the works of J.R.R. Tolkien by Timothy R. O'Neill.  It is written from a Jungian perspective, with particular emphasis on Jungian archetypes.

Reception
The book was called "a compelling and influential Jungian reading" (2013) by Christopher Vaccaro, editor of The Body in Tolkien's Legendarium. 

Tolkien scholar Thomas Honegger called it "the unsurpassed standard work on the subject" (2019).

References

Books of literary criticism
Books about Middle-earth
1979 non-fiction books
Houghton Mifflin books